Ahmadabad (also Romanized as Aḩmadābād; also known as Amīnābād) is a village in Neh Rural District, in the Central District of Nehbandan County, South Khorasan Province, Iran. At the 2006 census, its population was 23, in 5 families.

References 

Populated places in Nehbandan County